Bridge of Flowers could refer to:
Bridge of Flowers (event), an event in 1990 by demonstrators who advocated for the unification of Romania and Moldova.
Bridge of Flowers (bridge), a bridge in Shelburne Falls, Massachusetts.